Howard Aldridge Coffin (June 11, 1877 – February 28, 1956) was a politician from the U.S. state of Michigan.

Biography
Coffin was born in Middleborough, Massachusetts and attended the Vermont Academy at Saxtons River. He graduated from Brown University, Providence, Rhode Island, in 1901 and was a teacher in the Providence Friends School that same year.

He worked as a representative for the book publishers, Ginn & Company, 1901-1911; controller, Warren Motor Car Company, Detroit, Michigan, 1911-1913; manager, Firestone Tire and Rubber Company, of Michigan, 1913-1918; secretary, Detroit Pressed Steel Company, 1918-1921; assistant to president, Cadillac Motor Company, of Detroit, 1921-1925; vice president and later president, White Star Refining Company, 1925-1933; general manager, Socony-Vacuum Oil Company, 1933–1946.

In 1946, Coffin was elected as a Republican to the United States House of Representatives from Michigan's 13th congressional district, defeating former Representative Clarence J. McLeod in the Republican primary and going on to defeat incumbent Democrat George D. O'Brien in the general election. Coffin served in the 80th Congress, from January 3, 1947 to January 3, 1949. In a re-match, Coffin lost to O'Brien in the general election of 1948.

Coffin organized the Industrial Service Bureau in Washington, D.C., and was a business consultant until his retirement in 1954. He died in Washington, D.C., in 1956 and is interred in Woodlawn Cemetery, Detroit, Michigan.

References

Howard A. Coffin at The Political Graveyard

External links

1877 births
1956 deaths
Baptists from Michigan
People from Middleborough, Massachusetts
Brown University alumni
ExxonMobil people
Republican Party members of the United States House of Representatives from Michigan
Burials at Woodlawn Cemetery (Detroit)
Vermont Academy alumni